NARI may refer to:

National Agricultural Research Institute (Eritrea), a semi autonomous unit of the Ministry of Agriculture in Eritrea
Noradrenaline reuptake inhibitor, a chemical compound found in the central nervous system